McDonogh 19 Elementary School is an American elementary school located at 5909 St. Claude Avenue in the Lower Ninth Ward of  New Orleans, Louisiana.  Along with William Frantz Elementary School, it was involved in the New Orleans school desegregation crisis during 1960.

History

Background 
The school was built in 1929.  It was funded by John McDonogh through the McDonogh Fund which built schools in New Orleans and in Baltimore, Maryland.  It was designed in Italian Renaissance Revival style by the New Orleans Parish School Board's architect E.A. Christy.

Desegregation 
It was an all-white school, integrated in the fall of 1960 by three young black girls, Leona Tate, Tessie Prevost,
and Gail Etienne, known as the McDonogh Three.

Post-integration
It was listed on the National Register of Historic Places in 2016.

In 2021, the building was purchased by Leona Tate and her foundation, to be transformed into a museum chronicling Civil Rights history with the help of Xavier University's Investigative Stories Program.

References

External links

School buildings on the National Register of Historic Places in Louisiana
Italian Renaissance Revival architecture in the United States
Buildings and structures completed in 1929
Elementary schools in New Orleans
Public elementary schools in Louisiana